Harrison School District No. 1 is a public school district in Boone County, Arkansas, United States which serves the city of Harrison along with other unincorporated areas within the county.  The Harrison School District serves one large contiguous area and a smaller non-contiguous area in the southeast portion of the county. It also includes a section of Newton County.

Schools 
 Harrison High School
 Harrison Middle School
 Eagle Heights Elementary School
 Forest Heights Elementary School
 Skyline Heights Elementary School
 Woodland Heights Elementary School
 Harrison Alternative School

Harrison Senior High School 
Harrison Senior High School serves ninth through twelfth grades throughout the Harrison School District.  Based on the 2009-2010 academic year, the total enrollment in the school was 598 and total full-time teachers was 48.40, with a teacher/student ratio of 12.36.

Harrison Middle School 
Harrison Middle School serves fifth, sixth, seventh, and eighth grades throughout the Harrison School District.  Based on the 2009-2010 academic year, the total enrollment in the school was 425 and total full-time teachers was 24.70, with a teacher/student ratio of 17.21.  The Harrison Middle School was dedicated in February, 2005.

Eagle Heights Elementary School 
Eagle Heights Elementary School offers preschool through fourth grade.  Based on the 2009-2010 academic year, the total enrollment in the school was 188 and total full-time teachers was 19.20, with a teacher/student ratio of 9.79.

Forest Heights Elementary School 
Forest Heights Elementary School offers kindergarten through fourth grade.  Based on the 2009-2010 academic year, the total enrollment in the school was 366 and total full-time teachers was 21.90, with a teacher/student ratio of 16.71. In mid-2011, an addition was completed at Forest Heights Elementary School as part of a $5 million facilities project which included other elementary schools in the district.
In 2011, the school was nationally recognized with the top honor by the U.S. Department of Education (ED) as a National Blue Ribbon School.

Skyline Heights Elementary School 
Skyline Heights Elementary School offers kindergarten through fourth grade.  Based on the 2009-2010 academic year, the total enrollment in the school was 415 and total full-time teachers was 25.60, with a teacher/student ratio of 16.21.

Woodland Heights Elementary School 
Woodland Heights Elementary School offers kindergarten through fourth grade.  Based on the 2009-2010 academic year, the total enrollment in the school was 133 and total full-time teachers was 11.80, with a teacher/student ratio of 11.27.

Board of Education 
The Harrison School District Board of Education is composed of seven elected members.  Elections are staggered.  Regular meetings are held monthly.  Parents and other members of the public may listen but may not speak or ask any questions during Harrison School Board of Education meetings.
Current board members include:
 Bill Boswell
 Jon Burnside
 Wordna Deere
 Karen Dezort
 Gwen Hoffman
 Joe Melton
 John Sherman

Staffing 
Based on the 2009-2010 academic year, the total full-time staff of the Harrison School District was 433.  The total full-time teachers was 201.  The total number of non-teaching staff (including 9 administrators) was 232.

History 
In 1980 the Newton County School District dissolved, with a portion going to the Harrison district.

Preschool began to be developed in the Harrison School District in 2006.

On February 25, 2010, the Harrison School District Board of Education announced the appointment of Dr. Melinda Moss as superintendent, effective July 1, 2010.  She served as assistant superintendent and was selected out of four finalists.

Demographics 
Within the geographic area covered by the Harrison School District, there were 4,624 individuals under the age of 18, during the 2009-2010 academic year. For 2019 the population was 20,576. The median household income was $43,240. 93% were White, 0% Black, 3% Hispanic or Latino, 1% Asian, 1% American Indian or Alaskan native, and 3% were of two or more races.

See also 

 List of school districts in Arkansas

References

Further reading
These include maps of predecessor districts:
 (Download)
 (Download)

External links 
 
 Harrison School District Board of Education Meeting Minutes
 
 Boone County School District Reference Map (US Census Bureau, 2010)
 Harrison School District (National Center for Education Statistics)
 2010 Arkansas Legislative Audit for the Harrison School District

School districts in Arkansas
Education in Boone County, Arkansas
Schools in Boone County, Arkansas
Harrison, Arkansas